Marie Riou (born 21 August 1981) is a French sailor who competed in the 2012 Summer Olympics in the Elliott 6m class with Claire Leroy and Élodie Bertrand coming 6th overall.

In the 2017–18 Volvo Ocean Race, she sailed on Dongfeng Race Team.

References

External links
 

1981 births
Living people
French female sailors (sport)
Olympic sailors of France
Sailors at the 2012 Summer Olympics – Elliott 6m
Sailors at the 2016 Summer Olympics – Nacra 17
Nacra 17 class world champions
World champions in sailing for France
Volvo Ocean Race sailors
21st-century French women